Svetlana Stevic Vukosavljević (born 15 February 1948 in Milatovac), graduated from the Chemical-technological technical school in Belgrade.

More than 35 years Vukosavljević is engaged in research work in the field of ancestral culture in Homolje – Eastern Serbia. As a gifted singer of the traditional Serbian songs, in 1976, she became a soloist of Radio Belgrade and since then has left a large opus of permanent recordings sound archives of Radio Belgrade. That same year she became a collaborator on several programs on Radio Belgrade, "Svanovnik" (the Dawn), "Od zlata jabuka" (Golden Apple) and "Riznica" (Treasury) in which she still participates.

In 2009, Vukosavljević received a special award which is awarded to the artists for superior contribution to the national culture of the Republic of Serbia.

References

External links
Vukosavljević in concert (video)

1948 births
Living people
People from Žagubica
Serbian folklorists
20th-century Serbian women singers
Women folklorists
Yugoslav women singers